The 2000–01 Japan Figure Skating Championships were the 69th edition of the event. They were held on December 8–10, 2000 at the Big Hat arena in Nagano. National Champions were crowned in the disciplines of men's singles, ladies' singles, pair skating, and ice dancing. As well as crowning the national champions of Japan for the 2000–01 season, the results of this competition were used to help pick the teams for the 2001 World Championships and the 2001 Four Continents Championships.

Competition notes
 The following skaters placed high enough at Junior Nationals and so were invited to compete at Nationals: Soshi Tanaka, Kazumi Kishimoto, and Kensuke Nakaniwa for men, and Akiko Suzuki, Utako Wakamatsu for ladies.
 Yukari Nakano and Yuko Kawaguchi / Alexander Markuntsov did not compete due to a time conflict with the 2000–01 ISU Junior Grand Prix.

Results

Men

Ladies

Pairs

Ice dancing

Japan Junior Figure Skating Championships
The 2000–01 Japan Junior Figure Skating Championships took place between November 25 and 26, 2000 at the Nagoya Rainbow Hall.

The following skaters placed high enough at Novice Nationals to be invited to compete here: Miki Ando (1st in novice, 3rd in junior) and Takahiko Kozuka (1st in novice, 18th in junior).

Although normally under the rules, a podium finish in the Ladies event on the Junior level would bring an invitation to compete at the senior level, twelve years old Miki Ando was not able to be invited due to her age and skating level.

Men
 Entry: 27 athletes

Ladies
 Entry: 32 athletes

Ice dancing

International team selections

World Championships

Four Continents Championships

World Junior Championships

External links
 2000–01 Japan Figure Skating Championships results
 2000–01 Japan Junior Figure Skating Championships results 

Japan Figure Skating Championships
2000 in figure skating
2001 in figure skating
2000 in Japanese sport